Al-Zurzuriyah is a village in northern Syria located west of Homs in the Homs Governorate. According to the Syria Central Bureau of Statistics, al-Zurzuriyah had a population of 1,117 in the 2004 census. Its inhabitants are predominantly Shia Muslims.

References

Populated places in Homs District
Shia Muslim communities in Syria